Cythera may refer to:

Places
 Cythera (island), an island of Greece, also written Kythira, Kythera, Kithira
 Cytherean: pertaining to the island Cythera 
 Cythera (ancient town), an ancient town on the island of Cythera

Ships
 USS Cythera, the name of two United States Navy ships
 Cythera (yacht), a steel ketch, designed and built by Peter A. Fenton, launched in 1962
 Cythera, a yacht lost with all aboard during the Great Blizzard of 1888

Other
 Cythera (video game) a computer game by Ambrosia Software
 Cythera (novel), a 1998 novel by Richard Calder
 In Cythera, a 2012 song by Killing Joke

See also
Cytherea (disambiguation)
The Embarkation for Cythera, a painting by French painter Jean-Antoine Watteau